The Columbus Southern Railway is a historic railroad that operated in the U.S. state of Georgia. The railroad operated an 88-mile line from Columbus to Albany that opened in 1890.

History
It was originally chartered in 1885 as the Columbus and Florida Railway.  The Columbus Southern Railway was created in 1886 after the C&F's charter was amended.  It rapidly ran into financial difficulties. In 1889 the State of Georgia demanded its assets be handed over to local counties for unpaid taxes. The company fought the order and the case made its way to the Supreme Court which in 1894 decided in Columbus Southern Ry. Co. v. Wright that the 14th Amendment did not protect the company from these actions. 

Soon after the decision the railway was sold to John Skelton Williams's Georgia and Alabama Railroad in 1896.

References

External links
 Stock Certificate for the Columbus Southern Railway Company — The Columbus Museum

Defunct Georgia (U.S. state) railroads
Predecessors of the Seaboard Air Line Railroad
Railway companies established in 1886
Railway companies disestablished in 1896
1886 establishments in Georgia (U.S. state)
1896 disestablishments in Georgia (U.S. state)